The Fieldale Towlers was the primary moniker of the minor league baseball teams based in Fieldale, Virginia from 1934 to 1936. Fieldale teams played as members of the Class D level Bi-State League from 1934 to 1936. The Fieldale Towlers were an affiliate of the Detroit Tigers (1936).

Pro Football Hall of Fame member Joe Guyon was player/manager of the 1936 Fieldale Towlers.

History 
The Fieldale Virginians began minor league play as charter members of the 1934 Class D level Bi-State League. The Virginians finished their first season with a record of 36–41, placing 3rd in the six–team Bi-State League regular season under Manager Luther Hodge. The 1934 standings were: Danville-Schoolfield Leafs 53–25, Martinsville Manufacturers 46–29,  Fieldale Virginians 36–41, Mount Airy Graniteers 33–43, Leaksville-Draper-Spray Triplets 32–45 and Mayodan Senators 29–46.  Fieldale played their home games at Riverside Park.

The franchise was renamed as the Fieldale Towlers for the 1935 season. The moniker reflected the local industry of towel–producing textile mills. Continuing play in the Bi-State League, the Towlers ended the 1935 season with a record of 50–64, placing sixth in the eight–team Bi-State League regular season. Dixie Parker served as the Fieldale manager in 1935.

In their final season, the Fieldale Towlers became an affiliate of the Detroit Tigers. Fieldale finished the 1936 regular season with a record of 52–62, placing 7th in the Bi-State League standings. Joe Guyon, Red Smith and Jimmie Rimmer all served time as manager in 1936. Joe Guyon had a storied football career and was inducted into the Pro Football Hall of Fame in 1971. The Fieldale franchise folded from the Bi-State League following the 1936 season and were replaced by the South Boston Twins for the 1937 Bi-State League season. Fieldale, Virginak has not hosted another minor league franchise.

The ballpark
From 1934 to 1936 Fieldale teams played home games at Riverside Park. Riverside Park had a ballpark capacity of 1,500, with field dimensions (Left, Center, Right) of: 325–380–325 (1936). Today, the site is known as Fieldale Park and has a baseball field that is still in use. The address is 188 Field Avenue, Fieldale, Virginia, 24089.

Timeline

Year-by-year records

Notable alumni

Joe Guyon (1936, MGR) Pro Football Hall of Fame
Jack Hallett (1936)
Ralph Hodgin (1936)
Joe Just (1936)
Ken Keltner (1936) 7x MLB All-Star; Cleveland Indians Hall of Fame
Boots Poffenberger (1935)
Dixie Parker (1935, MGR)
Red Smith (1936, MGR)
Roy Vaughn (1935)

References

Defunct minor league baseball teams
Professional baseball teams in Virginia
Defunct baseball teams in Virginia
Baseball teams established in 1934
Baseball teams disestablished in 1936
Detroit Tigers minor league affiliates
Bi-State League teams
Henry County, Virginia